Balapaduwaduge Manukulasuriya Lakshman Mendis (born 19 May 1955), popularly as Lakshman Mendis, is an actor in Sri Lankan cinema, theatre and television.

Personal life
He was born on 19 May 1955 in Colombo, Sri Lanka. His father Reggie Mendis was a former member of the Central Committee of the Lanka Sama Samaja Party (LSSP). Born in Moratuwa, Reggie was a church clerk as a child. Reggie was the Secretary of the Board of Education of the ancient Lanka Sama Samaja Party in the past and considered the crucial role of educating his party members to be trained and experienced in Marxism today. In the early 1940s he joined the Bolshevik Leninist Party. Meanwhile, The British government had issued an order to shoot Reggie at the scene. His leadership in Pettah Place during the 1952 nationwide Hartal War was prominent. As the LSSP leaders descend from City Hall in 1955 rally, one of the robed men, detonated a bombed. Reggie's hand was broken near his wrist when he was hit by an oncoming bomb to protect Colvin R. de Silva. Reggie died in December 2014.

Lakshman completed education at Royal College, Colombo. In the early days, he worked as a clerk in the Embilipitiya paper mill. But he was expelled for political reasons. Then under the guidance of his father's friend, Mendis studied gemology and ran the gem business for 11 years. He later became a successful gem merchant in Kahawatta.

He is married to Geetha Shyamali of Balangoda. The couple has one son and one daughter. His son is studying gemology at the University of Moratuwa and is involved in the gem business. The daughter is studying psychology at the University of Cambridge, England.

Career
At the age of 29, Lakshaman started his career in 1985 acting in a documentary tele drama Gangulen Egodata directed by his friend Dr. Dharmasena Pathiraja. In 1995, Pathiraja made a teledrama called Nadunana Puththu, where Mendis worked as a Production manager. Inspired by that serial, Sudath Mahadivulwewa did a similar teledrama with the title Dalulana Gini. Mendis played the supportive role 'Renganathan' in the serial, even though he did not get the role of father. In 1996, he made a critics acclaimed role 'Bryan' in the film thriller film Demodara Palama directed by Dinesh Priyasad, where he later won the Best Upcoming Actor award at 24th Sarasaviya Festival. In 2007, he won the Merit award for Best Performances at 32nd Sarasaviya Festival for the role in the film Anjalika.

In 2012, he acted in the political thriller Koombiyo directed by Lakmal Darmarathna. The serial was telecast in 2016 in ITN where it became the highest rated crime television drama on IMDb database receiving a score of 9.9/10 in which resulted by majority voting 10/10. In 2016, he was invited to play the lead role in the biopic film Nidahase Piya DS directed by Suneth Malinga Lokuhewa. When the director informed Mendis about the biopic, he was bit confused as he is a member of the left wing where Mendia politically had a problem. When Mendis could not find an answer to this question, he met Pathiraja and asked him about this. After positive response from the film crew, Mendis consented to take on the role. The film was later screened in 2018 and received positive reviews for his character. In the same year, he joined the stage play Handa Nihanda produced by Jayalath Manoratne.

In 2017, Lakshman acted in the drama serial Maddahana directed by Sumith Ratnayake. He won the award for the Best Supporting Actor at both Raigam Tele'es and Sumathi Awards for this role. In 2019, he was elected as the Secretary of the Sinhala Cultural Institute commonly known as Sudarshi. In 2020, he appeared in two television serials: Ahanna Kenek Na and Sudu Andagena Kalu Awidin, both received several awards at local festivals.

Selected television serials
 Ahanna Kenek Na as Dunsten Madugalle 
 Ambu Daruwo 
 Ehipillamak Yata  
 Gangulen Egodata as Sirisena
 Indrakeelaya 
 Kadulla 
 Kampitha Vil 
 Kaluwara Anduna 
 Koombiyo as Dissanayake  
 Maddahana as Jayasundara 
 Maha Polowa as Kabara 
 Mama Nemei Mama  
 One Way
 Paanamankada
 Sadgunaakaaraya 
 Samanala Wasanthaya 
 Sudu Andagena Kalu Awidin as Prof. Amarapala 
 Vinivindimi Andura

Filmography

References

External links

Living people
1955 births
Sri Lankan male film actors
Sri Lankan male television actors
Sinhalese male actors
Sri Lankan businesspeople